Dummer is an unincorporated community in the Rural Municipality of Caledonia No. 99, Saskatchewan, Canada.

See also

 List of communities in Saskatchewan

Caledonia No. 99, Saskatchewan
Unincorporated communities in Saskatchewan
Division No. 2, Saskatchewan